‌Pintu Nanda ((7 July 1977 – 1 March 2023) was an Indian film and television actor from Odisha. He started his career through an Odia daily soap on DD Odia. Later in 1996 he debuted in Ollywood through Koili. He appeared in more than 115 Odia movies in various roles as hero, villain, character artist and comedian. Some of his popular films include Dosti, Hata Dhari Chalu Tha, Rumku Jhumana, Wrong Number, Prema Rutu Asilare. Apart from TV and movies, he appeared in some popular Odia album songs. One of his famous Odia albums was E Gaura Kana Khauchu.

Early life and Family 
Nanda was born on 7 July 1977, to Ashok Kumar Nanda and Kantilata Nanda, in Jagatsinghpur, Odisha. His elder brother Abhiram Nanda is a popular flute player in Odisha. After completing his education from SK Academy in Jagatsinghpur, he studied in Delhi.

Personal life and death 
Nanda died at a hospital in Hyderabad, on 1 March 2023, at the age of 45. He was suffering from cirrhosis of the liver.

Filmography

Odia films

Television

Awards 
 2005: Odisha State Film Awards as best comedian for Wrong Number
 2006: Odisha State Film Awards as best comedian for Prema Rutu Asilare
 2014: Best Actor in Comic Role by Tarang Cine Awards for Deewana Deewani

References

External links 
 

1977 births
2023 deaths
Actors in Odia cinema
Indian film actors
21st-century Indian actors
Ollywood
People from Jagatsinghpur district